Peter Fisher (May 19, 1944 – July 10, 2012) was an American author and gay rights activist. An alumnus of Amherst College and Columbia University, he served in the US Air Force prior to becoming an early member of the Gay Activists Alliance, a protest group that split off from the Gay Liberation Front after the Stonewall riots with the goal of "writing the revolution into law." Fisher led a number of the "zaps", or protests targeted at public figures, organized by the Gay Activists Alliance, as well as serving as an unofficial historian for the group.

Describing Fisher, activist Bill Bahlman said, “Whenever he spoke at a GAA meeting, everybody listened. He could turn the debate on an issue around. And at demonstrations, he was larger than life.”

Fisher graduated Eastchester High School. He also graduated magna cum laude and Phi Beta Kappa from Columbia University in 1969. He was pursuing a graduate degree “but resigned to become a full-time homosexual. I have yet to regret it,” he wrote in 1972.

Fisher received the Stonewall Book Award in 1972 for The Gay Mystique: The Myth and Reality of Male Homosexuality, later described as "one of the first books to look at the subject from the inside rather than from a heterosexual’s viewpoint." His manuscripts and papers are archived at the Lesbian, Gay, Bisexual & Transgender Community Center in New York, together with those of his partner and fellow activist Marc Rubin. Fisher and Rubin met through the Gay Activists Alliance and were together for 37 years, until Rubin's death. Never recovering from Rubin's death in 2007, Fisher committed suicide in 2012 and their mingled ashes were scattered in the back yard of the sister in Springfield, Massachusetts.

Bibliography
The Gay Mystique: The Myth and Reality of Male Homosexuality (1972)
Special Teachers/Special Boys (1979) (with Marc Rubin)
Dreamlovers (1980)
Black Star (1983)

See also
Sylvia Rae Rivera
Vito Russo
Marc Rubin

References

1944 births
2012 deaths
20th-century American novelists
American science fiction writers
American LGBT writers
Amherst College alumni
Columbia University alumni
United States Air Force airmen
American male novelists
American LGBT rights activists
20th-century American male writers
Stonewall Book Award winners
Eastchester High School alumni